Wild olive is a common name for several plants and may refer to:

Bontia daphnoides
 Several species in the genus Elaeagnus (family Elaeagnaceae), particularly:
Elaeagnus angustifolia
Elaeagnus latifolia
Halesia carolina (family Styracaceae)
Nyssa aquatica, an American swamp-growing tree (family Cornaceae)
Olea europaea subsp. cuspidata
Olea oleaster, a species related to the cultivated olive tree (family Oleaceae)
Osmanthus americanus (family Elaeagnaceae)

See also
Native olive